Turkcell Kuruçeşme Arena was an open-air music venue located at Kuruçeşme neighborhood of Beşiktaş district in Istanbul, Turkey. It was also used as an outdoor cinema. The capacity of the arena was 17,000.

Performers
Concerts of notable artist or music groups the venue hosted are:

References

Buildings and structures in Istanbul
Beşiktaş
Music venues in Istanbul
Cinemas in Turkey
Bosphorus